The Newfoundland Railway operated on the island of Newfoundland from 1898 to 1988.

Early construction
In 1880, a committee of the Newfoundland Legislature recommended that a narrow-gauge railway be built from the colonial capital in St. John's to Halls Bay,  to the west. Construction was started on the Avalon Peninsula in August 1881 by the Blackman Syndicate.

The bondholders of the bankrupt Newfoundland Railway Company continued to build a  branch line from Brigus Junction to Harbour Grace (the Harbour Grace Railway), which was completed by November that year.

The colonial government undertook to build a branch from the junction at Whitbourne to the port of Placentia between 1886 and 1888.

Robert G. Reid

The colonial government sought new investors to continue the stalled project to Halls Bay and in June 1890, Scottish-born Montreal resident and railway engineer/contractor Robert Gillespie Reid agreed to build and operate the line. By 1892, Reid's workers were approaching the halfway point at the Exploits River when the government changed the terminus from Halls Bay approximately  further west, first to St. George's and finally to Port aux Basques. The route itself was diverted inland up the Exploits valley and over the Gaff Topsails (some of the highest elevation terrain on the island) and away from the coast once on the north bank of the Exploits River. This extension to the system was initially operated as the Newfoundland Northern and Western Railway and for it, Reid was granted land totalling .

The new line west to Port aux Basques was completed between 1894 and 1898. At the same time, Reid proposed a ferry service across the Cabot Strait from Port aux Basques to North Sydney, Nova Scotia, and contracted for a steamship to be built in Scotland. The Bruce arrived in the fall of 1897, before the line was completed to Port aux Basques, so her initial runs to Cape Breton Island were made from Little Placentia Sound. On June 29, 1898, the first passenger train arrived at Port aux Basques and the Bruce set sail with passengers for North Sydney.

Later that year, the colonial government persuaded Reid's company to take over operation of the bankrupt Newfoundland Railway Company and its sister Harbour Grace Railway, as well as the government-owned Placentia branch, in order to unify the system across the entire island (known as the Railway Contract of '98). The Reid company agreed to operate the lines for 50 years, in exchange for outright ownership and land grants. They also purchased the government drydock in St. John's and the telegraph system. The Reid company purchased eight new steamships to operate as coastal ferries around the island and into Labrador.

Controversy followed the awarding of so many assets to Reid, and in 1901 the contracts were modified to place everything under a limited liability corporation, named the Reid Newfoundland Company.

Reid's railway development in the colony began to attract attention to the potential of the island's natural resources. In 1903, the Reids partnered with a St. John's businessman, Harry J. Crowe, to purchase timber rights in Botwood, Norris Arm, Gambo, Gander Bay, and Point Leamington. In 1904, British investors named Harmsworth declared their intention to build a pulp and paper mill in Grand Falls and on January 7, 1905, the Anglo Newfoundland Development Company (AND) was formed, based on a partnership between the Harmsworths, Reid and the colonial government. Botwood was expanded through the construction of deepwater wharves and warehouses for shipping the finished pulp. To link the two, AND built the narrow gauge Botwood Railway (built to the same gauge as the Reid Newfoundland Company trackage) beginning in 1908 and completing it in 1909. It would later be renamed the Grand Falls Central Railway.

Reid died in 1908 but his company set the pace for development in Newfoundland's interior mining and forestry industries, although the entire operation continued to suffer losses. In 1909 and into the 1910s, the colonial government contracted for additional branch lines to be built. Some of the major works included:
 a line to Bonavista
 a line to Trepassey
 extend the Harbour Grace line through Carbonear to Bay de Verde
 several smaller branches, some of which were graded but rails were never installed

Nationalization
 
By the early 1920s, the Reid Newfoundland Company's losses were mounting and in 1923 the colonial government passed the Railway Settlement Act which cancelled the operating contract for the entire system, passing the railway into government control (a form of nationalization). Some of the lands that had belonged to the Reid Newfoundland Company were used by the government as part of a deal to develop a pulp and paper mill in Corner Brook.

The railway was initially called the Newfoundland Government Railway but was soon shortened to the Newfoundland Railway in 1926. It remained the property of the dominion government until Confederation on April 1, 1949, when it was transferred to the federal government's Canadian National Railway.

In 1925, the American Smelting and Refining Company (ASARCO) perfected a method for recovering individual metals in ore and entered into partnership with AND to develop a mine at Buchans, which was connected to the Newfoundland Railway by the Millertown Railway, also a  narrow gauge.

Wartime
Although the railway saw an increase in traffic during the First World War, it was extensive military-related construction in the late 1930s and early 1940s which proved the worth of the Newfoundland Railway as a strategic asset. An air force base was developed adjacent to the main line in Gander, and major American military bases were constructed in Stephenville (Ernest Harmon AFB), Argentia (NS Argentia) and St. John's (Pepperrell AFB), in addition to Canadian and British defence facilities in St. John's. Given the lack of roads and all-weather highways in Newfoundland during the 1940s, and the U-boat threat in the waters off-shore, the Newfoundland Railway became a vital, yet very obscure, supply link in the defence of the Northeast  Atlantic and the Allied convoy system.

When Winston Churchill met Franklin D. Roosevelt in Placentia Bay in 1941 to sign the Atlantic Charter, Churchill sent for Lord Beaverbrook, Minister of Aircraft Production. Beaverbrook flew into Gander and then travelled by rail to Placentia in the caboose of a freight train to save waiting for a passenger train.

In 1943, a joint project between AT&T and the United States Army established strategic landline telephone service along the railroad right-of-way.

In honour of the lost passengers and crew, the Newfoundland Railway Employees Association had the entire workforce forego a day's wages as a donation to a public campaign to build a memorial near the Port aux Basques railway terminal.

Canadian National

Newfoundland became the 10th province of Canada on March 31, 1949, and the Newfoundland Railway's assets were transferred to the control of the federal Crown corporation Canadian National Railway (CNR, CN post-1960). CN became a major presence in Newfoundland's early years as a province, controlling the railway, dry dock services, many ferries and coastal boats, and the telegraph system.

The Newfoundland Railway's premiere cross-island passenger train, The Overland Limited was renamed the Caribou by CN, although it was known colloquially as The Newfie Bullet. CN maintained the Caribou until 1969.

CN made major capital improvements, upgrading the main line, bridges, and rolling stock, and replacing steam locomotives with diesel units. Additional improvements were made to the ferry service, with new vessels and an expanded terminal at Port aux Basques. An additional indirect service improvement to the Newfoundland railway operations was made in 1955, with the opening of the Canso Causeway, linking Cape Breton Island with mainland North America and removing the need to ferry railcars destined for Newfoundland across the Strait of Canso.

CN's Newfoundland operations continued to see significant traffic increases with its improved ferry and rail connections, but faced increased truck and bus competition on completion of the Trans-Canada Highway across the island in 1965. New railcar-capable ferries were introduced; mainland standard-gauge railcars were ferried to Newfoundland, where their standard-gauge bogies were replaced with narrow-gauge bogies in Port aux Basques. This innovation was unsuccessful. The first casualty was the passenger rail service, which was abandoned in 1969 in favour of buses. CN began to essentially stop marketing its own Newfoundland rail operations through the 1970s and began to rely on trucks for hauling cargo.

In 1979, CN reorganized its narrow-gauge system into Terra Transport, as a means to separate the subsidy-dependent Newfoundland rail operations from its mainland North America core freight rail system. Rail cargo traffic continued to decline, and all branch lines on the island were closed in 1984. In 1987, Canada deregulated its railway industry, allowing abandonments to proceed with less red tape. The former CN subsidiary CN Marine was reorganized into Marine Atlantic in 1986 and one of the two railcar ferries was sold off, leaving the narrow-gauge system with limited interchange ability at Port aux Basques in its final two years. In December 1987 the provincial and federal governments signed a deal worth $800 million for highway improvements, removing the provincial government's opposition to the pending abandonment of the railway.

The railway was officially abandoned on October 1, 1988. Following abandonment, work trains continued to operate, assisting salvage crews to remove the rails from remote locations, particularly in the Gaff Topsails between the Exploits River and Deer Lake. The last train, prior to work trains removing rails, arrived from Port Aux Basques and departed Corner Brook eastbound on September 30 and arrived at Bishops Falls on the morning of October 1.

CN continued to operate its Roadcruiser Bus service and a CN Intermodal trucking operation in Newfoundland until 1996. With CN's privatization in late 1995, the company divested itself of all money-losing and most non-railroad interests, including CN Roadcruiser. Cross-island bus service was taken over by DRL Coachlines of Triton, Newfoundland on March 30, 1996. The CN Newfoundland trucking operation continued until fall 1996, and was then contracted to Clarke Transport.

Legacy
The former Newfoundland Railway station in St. John's now hosts the Railway Coastal Museum. Numerous towns across the island have preserved railway equipment on display.

With few exceptions, the roadbed now forms the T'Railway Provincial Park rail trail.  Until 2005, the Trinity Loop Amusement Park operated a miniature train, one of the few remaining places on Newfoundland with tracks still in place.  The park closed down and was abandoned in 2005 due to lack of interest. Since then, all of the buildings have been heavily vandalized and Hurricane Igor washed away part of the park, including a large section of the rail bed. Local railway fans have been pushing government to retain the park as an historic site but officials have expressed little interest.

Gravel cars used by WP&YR are still painted in CN orange; unconfirmed information indicates that some Newfoundland passenger cars were converted into passenger cars of vintage appearance for WP&YR.

The province of Newfoundland and Labrador still has railway transportation, operating on mainland Labrador. The Quebec, North Shore & Labrador Railway (QNSL) operates between Sept-Îles, Quebec, and the mining region of Labrador West. A former QNSL line, now owned and operated by Tshiuetin Rail Transportation, serves the former mining town of Schefferville, Quebec, passing through Labrador. QNSL also connects with Newfoundland and Labrador's other active railway, the Wabush Lake Railway.

Locomotives 

In addition, the Steam Rail Coaches A, B, C, D and E were built between 1923 and 1925 by Sentinel-Cammell for the Newfoundland Railway for service between Humbermouth and Curling West, St. John's and Topsail, and also on branch lines. Although successful in Britain, the type proved inadequate in the rugged winter weather of Newfoundland. Also, the necessity for a crew of three (engineer, fireman and conductor) meant that cost savings were not as great as expected. All were scrapped in 1938-39 after the closure of the Bay de Verde, Heart's Content and Trepassy branches.

See also

 Bogie exchange
 Newfoundland T'Railway
 Terra Transport
 Sakhalin Railway: Used Cape gauge until 2019, when conversion to Russian gauge was complete
 List of stock used by Ferrocarril de Antofagasta a Bolivia

References

Further reading

External links
 Railway Society of Newfoundland - Maintains historic train display at Humbermouth in Corner Brook
 History of the railway in the village of Stephenville Crossing
 Photos of railway displays and memorabilia across the island
 Railway-Coastal Museum
 Exploring the Newfoundland Railway Virtual Museum of Canada

Defunct Newfoundland and Labrador railways
Narrow gauge railways in Newfoundland and Labrador
3 ft 6 in gauge railways in Canada
Crown corporations of Newfoundland and Labrador
Former Crown corporations of Canada
Canadian National Railway subsidiaries
1988 disestablishments in Newfoundland and Labrador
1898 establishments in Newfoundland